Kim Chul-soo (Korean: 김철수; born July 6, 1952) is a South Korean football coach and former player. He was a defender for POSCO FC and represented the South Korea national team in 1976 AFC Asian Cup qualification.

He taught Lee Young-pyo, Park Ji-sung in elementary School.

He started abroad coaching career in Philippines since 2006.

References

External links 
 
 Kim Chul-soo – National Team Stats at KFA 

1952 births
Living people
Association football forwards
Pohang Steelers players
K League 1 players
South Korean footballers
Hanyang University alumni
South Korea international footballers